Clooneenagh, also Clonina, is a small village in west County Clare in Ireland. It is situated on the Cree Road between Cree East and Cree North near the villages of Doonbeg and Cooraclare.

Clonina is in the ecclesiastical parish of Cooraclare (Cree/Kilmacduane) within the Roman Catholic Diocese of Killaloe.

People 
Patrick Kelly (1875–1934) was born and raised in Clonina. He was a soldier, farmer and politician. He was a member of the Irish Free State Oireachtas (legislature) a Teachta Dála (TD) for the Clare constituency from 1927 to 1932.

Geography 
Many of the people living around Clonina are involved in agriculture and the majority of the land is used for dairy farming. The Creegh River flows through the village and enters the Atlantic Ocean at Doughmore Bay near Doonbeg.

References

Towns and villages in County Clare